Leslie Harrington is a fictional character in the novel and movie Peyton Place as well as the television series of the same name. In the movie, Leslie was played by actor Leon Ames.  Paul Langton played the role in the television series.

Synopsis
Leslie is the richest man in the community of Peyton Place, New Hampshire. He is the owner of the Cumberland Mills (in the movie, it was called the Harrington Woolen Mills), the community's textile plant and main employer. He is a widower, and  has a son named Rodney.

He had courted Elizabeth, even though she had been engaged to Seth Buswell, who later became the editor of the town's newspaper. Elizabeth died while giving birth to Rodney. He and his son had a good relationship, and he raised him while a single father. When Rodney was accused by amoral Betty Anderson of getting her pregnant, he tried to buy her off with a sum of $250. He was assessed a sum of $2,500 when Kathy Ellsworth lost her left arm when she fell over into the mechanics of a fun house at a carnival he owned.

Leslie has a compulsive need to win at everything. He allowed Rodney to run wild, which did not meet with the town's approval. Everyone else thought that Rodney got away with too much; but mostly they didn't question him, mainly because Leslie was the chairman of the board of trustees of the Citizens National Bank, the main bank in Peyton Place, and could and would yank mortgages from people who displeased him. He was also the head of the Peyton Place School Board, and had brought Michael Rossi into town to become school headmaster.

Everyone tolerates Leslie, although the town hoped that he would receive his comeuppance. He eventually does, in more ways than one, when Rodney dies in a car crash. That tragedy knocks the fire out of Peyton Place's leading citizen.

He later on realized that Betty had given birth to his grandson, Roddy. He grew to love Roddy and he spoiled him as unabashedly as he had spoiled Roddy's father. Although he had lost a lot of his power; he was still the wealthiest and most powerful citizen of Peyton Place. Harrington lived in the biggest house, drove the biggest car and had the biggest bank account.

In the television series, numerous changes were made.  Harrington ran the Peyton Mill but his wife Catherine Peyton Harrington was the actual owner. When Catherine died, Leslie took it for granted the ownership of the mill would be transferred to him, but before her death she had suspected Leslie of infidelity and amended her will, returning ownership and all stocks to her father Martin Peyton. (Harrington had in fact been having an affair with his secretary, Julie Anderson.)  Harrington decides to fight the amended will, claiming that Catherine was not of sound mind. A date is set for a court hearing but the day before going to court Harrington is advised by his lawyer to drop the proceedings, as he cannot possibly win.  In the television series, he was father to two sons, Rodney (played by Ryan O'Neal) and Norman (Christopher Connelly).

Fictional characters from New Hampshire
Peyton Place characters
Literary characters introduced in 1956
Characters in American novels of the 20th century